In various contexts, things are often described as "virtual" when they share important functional aspects with other things (real or imagined) that are or would be described as "more real".

These include the following:

Computing
Virtual airline
Virtual appliance
Virtual artifact
Virtual community
Virtual function
Virtual inheritance
Virtual intelligence
Virtual machine
Virtual memory
Virtual reality
Virtual world

Education and business
Virtual business
Virtual economy
Virtual education
Virtual learning environment
Virtual museum
Virtual school
Virtual team
Virtual tradeshow
Virtual university
Virtual volunteering
Virtual water
Virtual workplace

Entertainment and recreation
Virtual actor
Virtual art
Virtual band
Virtual character (disambiguation)
Virtual cinematography
Virtual concert
Virtual event
Virtual host
Virtual humans
Virtual influencer
Virtual sex
Virtual studio
Virtual YouTuber

Mathematics, physics, and medicine
Virtual colonoscopy
Virtual displacement
Virtual image
Virtual particle
Virtual patient
Virtual screening
Virtual surgery
Virtual work

Philosophy
Virtual (philosophy)
Virtual artifact
Reality

Telecommunications and electronics
Virtual channel
Virtual circuit
Virtual ground
Virtual queue
Virtual touch screen

See also 
Virtuality (disambiguation)
Virtualization
Virtually, used to modify a property in abstract algebra so that it need only hold for a subgroup of finite index